Walenty Kłyszejko (2 December 1909 – 20 August 1987) was an Estonian–Polish basketball coach and player. He was also a professor of physical education at the Józef Piłsudski University of Physical Education in Warsaw.

Klyszejko was born in Saint Petersburg. Some time in the 1910s, he moved with family to Tallinn, where began playing basketball at the local YMCA team as well as for the national basketball team of Estonia, for which he capped five times. In the 1933, he came to Poland to study at The Academy of Physical Education in Warsaw and became a coach of Polonia Warszawa. In 1936 he became coach of the national basketball team of Poland, which at the 1936 Summer Olympics was placed on the fourth spot, the best in the history of Polish basketball. In 1939, during the European Championships, Poland under Klyszejko won bronze.

Klyszejko fought in the Polish September Campaign, after which he managed to get to Great Britain, where he remained a soldier of the Polish Army. After the war, he returned to Poland, coaching the team of AZS-AWF Warszawa, writing books about sports and lecturing.

References
History of Polish basketball before World War II
Official webpage of Polish Government's Ministry of Sports

External links
 

1909 births
1987 deaths
Basketball players from Saint Petersburg
People from Sankt-Peterburgsky Uyezd
People from the Russian Empire of Polish descent
Estonian people of Polish descent
Polish basketball coaches
Estonian men's basketball players
Estonian basketball coaches
Polish non-fiction writers
Polish male non-fiction writers
Polish military personnel of World War II
Polish United Workers' Party members
Naturalized citizens of Poland